Sun Yue (1878–1928) was a warlord member of the Guominjun and governor at various times of Hebei, Henan and Shaanxi.

Sun Yue was born in 1878 in Gaoyang, Hebei, China.

After Feng Yuxiang led his army to overthrow Cao Kun in the Beijing coup, Sun was made civil governor of Henan on 7 November 1924, a post he held until 29 August 1925. The following day he was made General in command of converting the Beijing gendarmerie into the Third Brigade of the Gominjun.

He next was made the Guominjun military governor of Shaanxi from 29 August 1925 to 25 December 1925. From that date Sun was made the Guominjun military and civil governor of Zhili until 21 March 1926.  Lastly he was the Guominjun civil governor of Shaanxi from 11 April 1926 to October 1927, when the Gomunjun joined Chiang Kai-shek in the Northern Expedition, and he was replaced by Song Zheyuan as its first Chairman of the province.

Sun died on 27 May 1928 in Shanghai.

References

Sources
  Rulers: Chinese Administrative divisions, Hebei, Henan and Shaanxi

1878 births
1928 deaths
Republic of China warlords from Hebei
Politicians from Baoding
Governors of Shaanxi